Dell Flight Strip  is a public-use airport located one nautical mile (1.85 km) northwest of the central business district of Dell, in Beaverhead County, Montana, United States. It is owned by the Montana Department of Transportation Aeronautics Division and provides general aviation service.

History
The airport was built by the United States Army Air Forces about 1942 as an emergency landing airfield for military aircraft on training flights.    It was closed after World War II, and was turned over for local government use by the War Assets Administration (WAA).

In 1988, the airport "teetered on the verge of abandonment" until Leon Hirsch, an executive at United States Surgical Corporation, purchased a nearby ranch, and paid to upgrade the airport so he could land his Learjet.

Facilities and aircraft 
It has one runway designated 14/32 with an asphalt surface measuring 7,000 by 70 feet (2,134 x 21 m). For the 12-month period ending September 25, 2009, the airport had 950 general aviation aircraft operations, an average of 79 per month.

References

External links 

 Aerial image as of 1 August 1995 from USGS The National Map
 

Airports in Montana
Buildings and structures in Beaverhead County, Montana
Flight Strips of the United States Army Air Forces
Airfields of the United States Army Air Forces in Montana
Transportation in Beaverhead County, Montana